Parkinsons Lake is a eutrophic, 1.92 ha, sand dune lake in the Waikato District of New Zealand, near the southern part of Karioitahi Beach. It used to be choked by dense growths of native and introduced aquatic plants.

See also
List of lakes in New Zealand

References

Lakes of Waikato